Peter Biľak (born 1973 in Czechoslovakia) is a Slovak graphic and typeface designer, based in The Hague, The Netherlands. He works in the field of editorial, graphic, and type design; teaches typeface design at the postgraduate course Type&Media at the KABK, Royal Academy of Art (The Hague). He started Typotheque in 1999, Dot Dot Dot in 2000 (with Stuart Bailey), Indian Type Foundry in 2009, Works That Work magazine in 2012, and Fontstand in 2015. He is a member of AGI, (Alliance Graphique Internationale.) and lectures on his work internationally. He is a writer for numerous design magazines and frequently contributes writing and design to books and publications that include Print, Emigre, Eye (magazine), Items, tipoGrafica, Idea (magazine), Abitare and, Page.

He has designed several fonts including FF Eureka (published by Fontshop) and Fedra (published by his own type foundry Typotheque). He works on a broad range of cultural and commercial projects and his interest in each discipline extends beyond the practice of design to the inquisitive exploration of it.

Early life 
Biľak was born in Czechoslovakia. He started art at the Art Academy in Bratislava, then studied briefly in the United Kingdom and the United States. Later, he went to Atelier National de Création Typographique in Paris, where he obtained his Master's degree, and Jan van Eyck Academie in Maastricht, Netherlands for his postgraduate laureate.

His biggest influences were the places he has lived. In school, he found out that many things he was taught in school turned out to be mainly false, and that it was easy to manipulate information. Those places made him question what he already knew. Traveling during that time made him more independent and allowed him to see things from multiple perspectives.

As a student in Czechoslovakia, Biľak was often frustrated by the fact that his language was not supported by most typefaces.

He later went on to develop typefaces for Russian and Greek, however a significant achievement came with Arabic, which was a language he had no knowledge about. This began his type-designing career.

During his studies, he had encountered people, whom he referred to as 'inspiring teachers' such as Irma Boom, Karel Martens, Armand Mevis, and Michael Rock.

Career 
Biľak started his career with international design agency, Studio Dumbar in The Hague, where he worked between 1999 and 2001. After leaving Studio Dumbar, he started working independently.

In 1999, Biľak established the type foundry Typotheque with the idea of "digging out all the projects from the drawers and publishing them." Originally starting with a single typeface, Typotheque then published articles, book reviews and interviews with other designers, and quickly became a source of reference in the world of design and typography. In October 2009, Typotheque was the first type foundry to license its entire font collection as webfonts.

Typotheque's webfont service uses  rule in CSS, and serves the appropriate font file to different browsers, from their network of distributed servers.

Because of his interest in languages, he worked in 2007 with Indian designer Satya Rajpurohit on the Hindi version of Fedra Sans, and in 2009 started the Indian Type Foundry. Similar to Typotheque, ITF started out with a single typeface, but has larger plans to develop typefaces for all Indian writing scripts such as Devanagari, Tamil, Bengali, Gujarati, Kannada, Malayalam, etc. It also has plans to organize lectures and workshops in India, and to publish typefaces made by local designers. Prajavani, a major South Indian newspaper, has engaged the firm to create a custom typeface, something virtually unheard of in Indian publishing. Since then, ITF has created fonts for multinationals such as Google, Apple, Sony, Samsung and Amazon, among others.

For his contribution to the non-Latin typography, he was named in 2012 one of the 12 Game Changers by Metropolis.

In 2014, Deputy Prime Minister and Minister of Foreign and European Affairs of the Slovak Republic awarded Biľak the Goodwill Envoy award  for spreading the good reputation of Slovakia in an exceptional manner.

Together with Kristyan Sarkis, a Lebanese designer based in the Netherlands, Biľak has co-founded TPTQ Arabic, a sister company that develops original Arabic typefaces and systems for bilingual typography.

In 2015, Peter Biľak, together with Andrej Krátky co-founded Fontstand, a desktop app that allows trying fonts for free or renting them per month, also referred to as the "iTunes for Fonts". Fontstand has been included in the New Europe 100, a list of Central and Eastern Europe innovations that recognizes those with expertise in emerging technologies, unique skills and social outreach which have had a global impact. New Europe 100 is organized by Res Publica together with Google, the Visegrad Fund, and in cooperation with the Financial Times.

In 2019 he was awarded the Gold Prize in the European Design Awards for his font "Ping", a truly international typeface, supporting not only hundreds of Latin-based languages, but also Arabic, Armenian, Chinese (Simplified and Traditional), Cyrillic, Devanagari, Greek, Korean, Hebrew and Japanese. Creating a typeface with this versatility was an unprecedented achievement for a small independent type foundry.

Typeface design 

Biľak has been designing typefaces since the early 1990s. Noteworthy fonts are listed below:

 FF Eureka for FontFont, 1995
 FF Eureka Sans for FontFont, 1998
 Fedra Sans for Typotheque, 2001
 Fedra Mono for Typotheque, 2002
 Fedra Serif for Typotheque, 2003
 Fedra Arabic for Typotheque, 2007
 Greta Text for Typotheque, 2007
 Greta Display for Typotheque, 2007
 Greta Display for Typotheque, 2007
 History for Typotheque, 2008
 Irma Text for Typotheque, 2011
 Julien for Typotheque, 2011
 Karloff for Typotheque, 2012
 Lava for Typotheque, 2013

Magazines 
Between 2000 and 2007, Biľak was the co-founder (along with Stuart Bailey), co-editor, and designer of Dot Dot Dot, an art and design journal. Dot Dot Dot is a biannual, self- published, after-hours magazine, originally centered around graphic design, later broadening in scope to interdisciplinary journalism on subjects that affect the way people look at the world, think about and make design. It was not meant to be a magazine showing visual outcomes of the design process, but presenting the recurring themes of daily work. It was designed to change the way of thinking from 'what a design magazine should show' to 'what we are interested in as designers'. After three issues, the tagline 'graphic design/visual communication magazine', was scrapped, since Biľak thought there was no reason why some things like film, music, literature should not be in the magazine. The only connection it has with graphic design is that the co-founders studied design. The last issue of Dot Dot Dot magazine was published in summer 2010.

In 2013, after raising €30,000 in a crowdfunding campaign, Biľak founded Works That Work, a magazine of unexpected creativity, published twice a year by Typotheque, in print and digital edition. Works That Work is an international design magazine that studies the impact of design around the world, something like a National Geographic of design. The British national daily newspaper The Guardian named Works That Work as '[one] of the best-looking new magazines', and Nieman Journalism Lab at Harvard University reported how 'the small magazine has found a way to get noticed globally by creating a beautiful digital edition as well as a creative way to distribute its print copies—gaining a lot of ever-coveted user engagement in the process.' . Works That Work distributes 43% of its print run  via their Social Distribution, a reader-based system of distribution of physical copies of the magazine bypassing traditional distribution channels.

Other projects 
In 2003, he designed a series of the standard post stamps for the Dutch Royal mail (TNT Post), today one of the Icons of the Post. The design of these standard postage stamps was inspired by the Dutch landscape, the starting point being the view of geometric fields from the air, the first view of the country offered to any visitor landing at Amsterdam airport. Besides the inspiration coming from the landscape, the stamps offer another reading. The design is purely typographical, as the width of each letter determines the width of the surrounding block. This depicts how old-style metal printing works, setting metal punches next to each other. In this respect the stamps can be seen as a modest homage to the traditions of Dutch typography. The stamps have been reprinted three times, totaling over 143,000,000 copies. The 2010 edition was slightly modified.

From 2004 he has been collaborating with the choreographer Lukáš Timulak on the concepts of dance performances. Together they were subject of an exhibition 'InLoop/EnTry' in Stroom, Centre for Art and Architecture. Biľak defines the concept of the dance pieces, getting involved very early on in the process. While it is clear what Timulak does as the choreographer, Biľak's role has been defined in the theater credits sometimes as designer, stage designer, sometimes as dramaturge, sometimes described simply by the noun 'concept'.

Talks and lectures
 Precisamos de novas fontes? Tipogracia 10, São Paulo Discussing approaching to designing new typefaces. Lecture, 2013
 Lançamento da revista Works That Work, Rio de Janeiro. Launch and presentation of Works That Work magazine in Parque Lage, Rio de Janeiro. Presentation, 2013
 Indic Language Typography for Print and Screen media. Society for News Design, New Delhi. Lecture, 2012
 Type Systems. Lecture at the Tag der Schrift symposium in Zurich. Lecture, Zurich, Switzerland, 2012
 Qual è il significato della vita. Lecture at the ISIA Urbino. Lecture and workshop, 2012
 It's About Time. Sofia Design Week, 2012. Lecture, 2012
 Non-Latin type. Babel Symposium Hfg Offenbach. Lecture, 2012
 Designing Type Systems. Tag der Schrift conference, Zürich. Lecture, 2012
 Language / Script / Type. Workshop at the MIT Institute of Design, Pune (India). Workshop, 2011
 Peter Bilak, typography. Raffles Millennium International, Bangalore, India. Lecture, 2011
 Quasar 5. Annual design festival of MIT Institute of Design. Lecture, 2011
 Possibilities of Typography. National Institute of Design, Ahmadabad, India. Lecture, 2011
 Shifts & Expanding possibilities of typography. Typo Berlin 2011. Lecture, 2011
 What constitutes a type family. ECAL, Lausanne. Lecture, 2011
 Expandiendo las posibilidades de la tipografía. Letter2, Buenos Aires. Lecture, 2011
 Web typography. Grafill, Oslo. Lecture, 2011
 Gebruikte Letters. Bern, Typo Club. Lecture, 2011
 Conceptual typography? A one-day conference, with six international speakers that illuminates the field of conceptual type. Lecture, 2010
 Typography on the Web. next(con)text, Media Factory & Department of Media, Helsinki. Lecture, 2010
 Webfonts. Munich, 13 November 2010. Round table discussion, 2010
 What is Typography? AGI Day, Den Haag. Lecture, 2010
 Peter Bilak, selected projects. 25 May 2010, Split Art Academy, Croatia. Lecture, 2010
 Newspaper typography. Society of Newspaper Designers, Lisbon, 12 Nov 2009. Lecture, 2009
 Peter Bilak, selected projects. Brumen foundation, 26. Oct 2009, Ljubjana, Slovenia. Lecture, 2009
 Peter Bilak, selected projects. Vienna Design Week, 8 Oct 2009. Lecture, 2009
 Dutch Graphic design. Hong Kong Design Centre, 6 Aug, 2009. Lecture, 2009
 History of History CPH Typo 09, Mediehøjskolen, Copenhagen, 16 Apr 2009. Lecture, 2009
 Language / Script / Type. VSVU, Academy of Fine Arts, Bratislava. Workshop, 2009
 23. Forum Typografie. Typografie zwischen Ulm und Amsterdam, 2008
 Typografie zwischen Ulm und Amsterdam. Hochschule für Künste Bremen. Lecture, 2008
 Peter Bilak, selected projects. A-Z 33, Typography Process Space Hasselt, Belgium, 20 May 2008. Lecture, 2008
 Quatro Grafici Olandesi. ISIA Urbino, Italy 7 Apr 2008. Lecture & workshop, 2008
 Typografiska Fredag. Royal Library of Sweden, Stockholm, 7 Mar 2008. Lecture, 2008
 École Supérieure d'Art et de Design, Amiens. Lecture, 2007
 Peter Bilak, selected projects. Zürcher Hochschule der Kunsten, 1 Dec 2007. Lecture, 2007
 Peter Bilak, selected projects. Dutch Design, Vilnius 12 Oct 2007. Lecture, 2007
 Peter Bilak, selected projects. AGI congress Amsterdam, 27 Sep 2007. Lecture, 2007
 Arabic type. Khatt symposium Amsterdam, 24 Aug 2007. Lecture, 2007
 Kyesign Conference, Goa, India. Lecture, 2006
 Rencontres de Lure, Lurs. Lecture, 2006
 Tag der Typografie. Zurich, 25 Nov 2006. Lecture, 2006
 Peter Bilak, selected projects. DesigYatra conference Goa, India, Sept 2006. Lecture, 2006
 Helden Avond. OffCorso 7 Willem de Kooning Academie, Rotterdam. Discussion, 2005
 Biographies Workshop. Eesti kunstacademi, Tallinn, Estonia (March 2005). Week long editorial workshop, 2005
 Designing History & Criticism. AIGA, National Design Conference 2001, Washington DC. Discussion, 2001

Exhibitions
 Typo en Mouvement. Le lieu du design, Paris, 2015
 Memory Palace. Victoria & Albert Museum, London, 2013
 Call for Type. Neue Schriften. Gutenberg Museum, Mainz, 2013
 All Possible Futures. SOMArts Cultural Center, San Francisco, 2013
 Bewegte Schrift / Type in Motion. Museum für Gestaltung Zürich, 2011
 Connecting Concepts. National Institute of Design, Ahmedabad, India, 2011
 van Grote waarde – Icon van de post. De Affiche Galerij (Poster Gallery), The Hague, 2011
 Cartografias do Processo. Lisbon, Palácio Quintela, 2011
 Deep Surface: Contemporary Ornament and Pattern. CAM Raleigh, 2011
 Graphic Design: Now in Production. Walker Art Center, Minneapolis, 2011
 Open Projects. 21e Festival international de l'affiche et du graphisme de Chaumont, 2010
 InLoop/EnTry: Peter Bilak & Lukáš Timulak. Stroom Den Haag, 2010
 Quick Quick Slow. Experimenta Lisbon, 2009
 Freedom and Order, Quattro Grafici Olandesi. ISEA Urbino, Italy, 2008
 Doubles Pages. Centre d'Art Contemporain Genève, 2008
 Multiverso. Torino, 2008
 Schrift in Form. Klingspor-Museums Offenbach, 2008
 Experiment and Typography. Brno, Prague, The Hague, Bratislava, Warsaw, Ljubljana, Budapest, 2006
 Communicate: British Independent Graphic Design since the Sixties. Barbican Art Gallery, London, 2006
 Work from Mars. in 2006
 The Future's bright. VIVID Design Rotterdam, NL, 2005
 Czech and Slovak Poster Art 1993–2003. Poster Museum Aarhus, Denmark, 2003
 Reading in Motion. 34th Zagreb Salon, Croatia, 1999

Notes
Typed Radio interview with Peter Biľak
 Progetto Grafico No.9, 2007, interview with Peter Biľak
Articles by Peter Biľak
Middendorp, Jan, Dutch Type. 010 publishers: 2004. .
  Eye magazine No.75, Spring 2010, Interview with Peter Biľak
Designing for India, Bangalore Mirror, 6 February 2011
Heller, Steven, The Design Entrepreneur Rockport Publishers:2008. .
Interview with designer Peter Bilak
Peter Bil'ak: Designing for dance, typefaces, and marginalized alphabets

References

External links
 Personal website of Peter Biľak
 Typotheque type foundry
 Works That Work magazine
 TPTQ Arabic, a sister type foundry
 Fontstand, a Mac app for testing and renting fonts

Slovak graphic designers
Independent type foundries
Slovak typographers and type designers
1973 births
Living people
Graphic design studios
Dutch graphic designers
Dutch typographers and type designers
Academic staff of the Royal Academy of Art, The Hague
Magazine founders
Design writers